Claudia Lorraine Church (born January 12, 1962) is an American country music singer-songwriter whose singles include "What's the Matter With You Baby" and "Home in My Heart (North Carolina)".

Biography
Church was the second daughter of Claude and Lucille Church.  Her father was a member of the US Army, so she lived in such places as Okinawa, Fayetteville, NC, Sandy, UT, and Colorado Springs, CO before she graduated from General William Mitchell High School.  After graduating, she moved to Dallas to attend college and continued her modeling career.  Modeling had her working in cities such as Chicago and Paris. In 1988, she moved to Nashville to realize her dreams of becoming a singer.

She has been married to singer-songwriter Rodney Crowell since 1998. They met while shooting a music video. During a brief break-up, Crowell wrote the song "Please Remember Me", which later became a hit for Tim McGraw. Later Crowell wrote "Making Memories of Us" for her as a Valentine's Day gift. The song became a major hit for Keith Urban.

Discography

Albums

Singles

Music videos

References

American women country singers
American country singer-songwriters
1962 births
Living people
People from Lenoir, North Carolina
Reprise Records artists
Singer-songwriters from North Carolina
Country musicians from North Carolina
21st-century American women